An automobile association, also referred to as a motoring club, motoring association, or motor club, is an organization, either for-profit or non-profit, which motorists (drivers and vehicle owners) can join to enjoy benefits provided by the club relating to driving a vehicle. There is most often an annual membership fee to join.  A membership identification card, valid for the time period of membership paid, is typically issued to the member.

Typical motor club benefits
Member benefits may include the following:

Use of the membership card as a bail bond card for minor traffic violations. In the USA this is especially useful for members driving outside their own state, since other state law enforcement agencies commonly do not recognize posting out-of-state driver's licenses as bail bond, but often will accept motor club member cards.
Emergency road service upon presentation of the membership card. Often there is a nationwide network with agreements with various local towing and other emergency road service providers.
Provision of maps, or other tourist or motoring information in some cases, to members.
In some cases, reward stickers or decals may be provided to the member to place in the window of his/her vehicle, offering a reward to someone who locates or reports the vehicle if stolen.
Sometimes certain services related to vehicles, such as transferring ownership, may be provided to members at a reduced cost.
Some businesses, such as motels, may provide members of certain motor clubs with discounts upon presentation of their membership cards.

Motor clubs

Africa

Automobile Association of Kenya
Automobile Association of South Africa

Asia

Japan
Japan Automobile Federation

Australia and New Zealand
Australian Automobile Association
Automobile Association of the Northern Territory (AANT) – Northern Territory
NRMA – New South Wales and Australian Capital Territory
Royal Automobile Association (RAA) – South Australia
Royal Automobile Club of Tasmania (RACT) – Tasmania
Royal Automobile Club of Queensland (RACQ) – Queensland
Royal Automobile Club of Victoria (RACV) – Victoria
Royal Automobile Club of Western Australia (RAC WA) – Western Australia
New Zealand Automobile Association (NZAA)

Europe

Armenia
FAA

Austria
ÖAMTC
ARBÖ

Bosnia and Herzegovina
BIHAMK

Croatia 
HAK

Germany
ADAC (Allgemeiner Deutscher Automobilclub)

Netherlands
ANWB

UK
Civil Service Motoring Association
RAC
The Automobile Association

Americas
Advantage Auto Club
Allstate Motor Club
American Automobile Association
Argentine Automobile Club
Better World Club
BP Motor Club (formerly Amoco Motor Club until 2001)
Canadian Automobile Association
DRIVE Roadside
Good Sam RV Emergency Road Service
Hiway Angels
RV Roadservice Online
Shell Motorist Club

See also
Car club
Automobile industry
Vehicle insurance
Effects of the automobile on societies
Fédération Internationale de l'Automobile

References

 
Emergency road services